Dollymount,  often known as "Dollyer" to Dubliners, is a coastal suburban area on the north coast of Dublin Bay, within Clontarf, on the northside of Dublin, Ireland, just east of Saint Anne's Park.

Dollymount Strand
The famous Wooden Bridge from Clontarf links to Bull Island and the 5 kilometres long stretch of sandy beach and dunes on the island's eastern shore; while the island is located in Clontarf and Raheny, the beach is called Dollymount Strand.

Amenities
Dollymount is primarily residential, having just a few shops and a restaurant near the fountain pond of St. Anne's Park. Most commercial facilities are found in the main Clontarf centres.

The area has a Roman Catholic church, St. Gabriel's, the third of the three Catholic churches in Clontarf, completed in the 1950s. A much earlier plan to build a second Clontarf Church of Ireland parish church in Dollymount to complement the church on Seafield Road was abandoned in the 19th century.

Manresa Jesuit Centre of Spirituality, located in what was Baymount Castle, is a Jesuit retreat house which hosts meetings and retreats. Visitors on retreat regularly record their appreciation of neighbouring Saint Anne's Park, Bull Island and Dollymount Strand.

History

Dollymount lies within the district of Clontarf, which surrounds it (as the citywards part of Bull Island is part of Clontarf). For history before the 19th century, see the relevant article. For details of the origin, from "The Neighbourhood of Dublin" (Weston St. John Joyce, 3rd edition, Dublin, 1920):
"The name of Dollymount would seem to have originated with a house bearing that title which stood on or adjoining the site of Sea Park in Mount Prospect Avenue, and which is shown in Duncan's Map of 1820. "Dollymount House" appears in the Dublin Directory up to 1836, after which it disappears, doubtless having been renamed, and in 1838 the name appears for the first time as that of a district, under the heading of "Green Lanes, Dollymount."
It is stated that the designation was adopted in the first instance by a member of the Vernon family as a compliment to his wife, by name Dorothy, or Dolly Vernon." The Green Lanes are still referred to as simply "Clontarf" in Thom's Irish Almanac & Official Directory of 1849.

References

See also
 List of towns and villages in Ireland

Towns and villages in Dublin (city)
Clontarf, Dublin